California South Bay University is a BPPE (Bureau for Private Post-secondary Education) approved private educational institution (School Code: 13317491) based in Sunnyvale, California.

California South Bay University offers the following degree programs: Master of Business Administration, Master of Science in Computer Science.

References 

Educational institutions established in 2007
Education in Sunnyvale, California
Universities and colleges in Santa Clara County, California
Private universities and colleges in California
2007 establishments in California